Ophelia Hoff Saytumah is a politician in Liberia. She was the mayor of Liberia's capital city of Monrovia. President Charles Taylor appointed her in 2001 to the position. She used to be the head of Ophelia Travel Agency and has served on the board of directors for Roberts International Airport. After she served as mayor she became a vice president of the Liberia Oil Company.

See also
 Timeline of Monrovia

References

External links
 Hoff Saytumah's reappointment in June 2006
I Won't Do It Again

Living people
Mayors of Monrovia
Women mayors of places in Liberia
Year of birth missing (living people)
21st-century Liberian politicians
21st-century Liberian women politicians